Raymond Eric Frearson (14 January 1904 – 26 February 1991) was an English cricketer. Frearson was a right-handed batsman who bowled Leg break. He was born in Lincoln, Lincolnshire and he died in Skegness, Lincolnshire.

External links
Ray Frearson at ESPNcricinfo
Ray Frearson at CricketArchive

1904 births
1991 deaths
Cricketers from Lincoln, England
English cricketers
East of England cricketers
Minor Counties cricketers
Lincolnshire cricketers